Durham is a rural locality in the Shire of Bulloo, Queensland, Australia. In the  Durham had a population of 36 people.

Geography
Cooper Creek passes north-south through the centre of the locality.

Three major outback roads pass through Durham:
 Adventure Way to South Australia
 Bullo Developmental Road to Cunnamulla
 Cooper Developmental Road to Quilpie

History
In the  Durham had a population of 36 people.

Heritage listings

The heritage-listed Burke and Wills Dig Tree is located beside the Bullah Bullah Waterhole at the Nappa Merrie pastoral station.

Education 
There are no schools in Durham and none nearby. Distance education and boarding school would be options.

Economy 
There are a number of homesteads in the locality:

 Durham Downs
 Joes Outstation
 Kihee
 Nappa Merrie
 New Bundeena Outstation
 St Anne's Cottage
 Woomanooka

References

External links 

Shire of Bulloo
Localities in Queensland